Bosko is an animated character.

Bosko may also refer to:

"Bosko", a police detective in the film Heat portrayed by Ted Levine
"Bosko", character in All the Right Moves
Boško, a Serbo-Croatian male given name
Oswald Bosko (died 1944), Austrian from Vienna who became a sergeant in the German Army

See also
Bosco (disambiguation)
Boska (disambiguation)